Clyde Leonard Carr (14 January 1886 – 18 September 1962) was a New Zealand politician of the Labour Party, and was a minister of the Congregational Church.

Biography

Early life and career
Carr was born in Ponsonby, Auckland in 1886. His father was the Rev. Thomas Goodwill Carr (died 1935). Carr was educated at Nelson College from 1899 to 1902. Ordained as a minister in 1915, he was on the Christchurch City Council between 1923 and 1927 and the Hospital Board in the 1920s, after working in commerce and banking. Carr was also committed to animal welfare and in April 1936 he was elected to the office of President of the federated Societies for the Prevention of Cruelty to Animals.

Political career

Carr joined the Labour Party in the early 1920s. His 1928 election win was an unexpected upset, ousting the popular local lawyer Frank Rolleston, who was Attorney-General, Minister of Justice, and Minister of Defence at the time. Rolleston was the son of William Rolleston, one of the most influential politicians of the 19th century in Canterbury.

Carr represented the Timaru electorate from 1928 to 1962, when he resigned. His long representation of the electorate is unique in that a provincial town was not a safe Labour seat, and he had no prior relation with the people of Timaru before moving there to contest the 1928 election.

He was a dissident, getting three votes when he ran against Peter Fraser for Labour's leadership in 1940 to replace Savage as party leader.

He was not appointed to any ministerial positions, but was Chairman of Committees (1947–1949) and Deputy Speaker (1946–1950). He was Vice-President of the Labour Party (1933–1934) and President (1936–1937). Carr was widely read, and could assist the whips if the party was caught "on the hop" by speaking for his full-time while the party reorganised. He had a struggle to exist on his Parliamentary salary (£7 or $14 a week when he entered the house in 1928) and also contribute to local raffles and fundraisers. To save money he lived in his office, sleeping on a day-bed, although Nash tried to ban this for a time.

Death

His wife died in April 1961 and he moved back to Christchurch soon after. He resigned from Parliament on 31 May 1962, and died on 18 September 1962.

Honours
Carr was born in Ponsonby, Auckland in 1886. His father was the Rev. Thomas Goodwill Carr (died 1935). Carr was educated at Nelson College from 1899 to 1902. Ordained as a minister in 1915, he was on the Christchurch City Council between 1923 and 1927 and the Hospital Board in the 1920s, after working in commerce and banking. Carr was also committed to animal welfare and in April 1936 he was elected to the office of President of the federated Societies for the Prevention of Cruelty to Animals.

Notes

References

Books by Carr

The two books above contain sketches of parliamentarians: many published in the "New Zealand radio record." 

|-

1886 births
1962 deaths
Christchurch City Councillors
Members of the New Zealand House of Representatives
New Zealand Labour Party MPs
New Zealand MPs for South Island electorates
New Zealand male poets
New Zealand Congregationalists
People educated at Nelson College
20th-century New Zealand poets
20th-century New Zealand male writers